Isla is a rural locality in the Shire of Banana, Queensland, Australia.

References 

Shire of Banana
Localities in Queensland